This is a round-up of the 2006 Dublin Senior Hurling Championship. The previous champions were UCD, who did not have a chance to retain their title this year as they were not entered in the competition. Craobh Chiaráin won the 2006 championship by Ballyboden St Endas to claim their 8th title. Craobh went on to the Leinster senior club hurling championship preliminary round against Mount Leinster Rangers of Carlow. They defeated Mount Leinster Rangers to go on to the semi final of the Leinster championship against Birr of Offaly.

Quarterfinals

Semi-final and Final

Last 16

Final
Craobh Chiaráins victory over Ballyboden St Endas meant that they progressed to the preliminary round of the Leinster championship against the Carlow hurling champions Mount Leinster Rangers. They lost heavily as was expected.

See also
 2007 Dublin Senior Hurling Championship
 2006 Dublin Senior Football Championship

External links
 Official Dublin Website
 Dublin on Hoganstand
 Dublin Club GAA
 Reservoir Dubs

Dublin Senior Hurling Championship
Dublin Senior Hurling Championship